Alva Burton Burris (January 28, 1874 – March 24, 1938) was a pitcher in Major League Baseball, playing one game for the Philadelphia Phillies in 1894. He also served as a coach and athletic director at Washington College.

Biography
Burris was born in Warwick, Maryland. He started attending Washington College in 1892 and also played on the baseball team there. By his junior year in 1894, he had become the college's athletic director, in addition to coach of the baseball team. Burris also played in Major League Baseball. After the college season ended, he appeared in one game for the Philadelphia Phillies as a pitcher, giving up 10 earned runs in five innings against the Baltimore Orioles. He also had two hits that day and ended his MLB career with a batting average of .500.

Burris continued to serve as coach and athletic director until 1906. During the offseasons, he coached and played (at every position on the field) for local semi-pro teams in Cambridge and Salisbury. He managed the Cambridge team to the Maryland-Delaware championship in 1908.

Burris also studied medicine at around this time, and he eventually set up practices and a drug store after his initial managing days were over. In 1911, he returned to professional baseball and helped create the independent Peninsula League. He was the league's first president in 1915. Burris was also a minor league manager for one season, in 1924, when he took over the Salisbury Indians of the Eastern Shore League. In his later years, he concentrated on his medical practice while also teaching sports to the youth of the community.

Burris suffered a stroke in 1938 and died in Salisbury, Maryland, at the age of 64. He was buried in Hollywood Cemetery. Burris was inducted into the Eastern Shore Baseball Hall of Fame in 2010.

References

External links

1874 births
1938 deaths
Major League Baseball pitchers
Philadelphia Phillies players
Minor league baseball managers
Washington College Shoremen baseball players
Baseball players from Maryland
Physicians from Maryland
People from Cecil County, Maryland
19th-century baseball players
20th-century American physicians